Kurt Enoch Stenberg (19 July 1888 – 26 March 1936) was a Finnish gymnast, who won bronze in the 1908 Summer Olympics.

Gymnastics 

He was the first Olympic medalist from Vaasa.

He won the Finnish national championship in team gymnastics as a member of Ylioppilasvoimistelijat in 1909.

Biography 

His parents were lieutenant Anton Ferdinand Stenberg and Gertrud Emilia Kurtén. He married Lyyli Elise Ylönen in 1919.

He performed his matriculation exam at the Vaasa Finnish Lycaeum in 1906. He graduated as a Master of Science (Technology) at the University of Hanover in 1915.

He worked at the Hannoversche Portland-Cementfabrik in Germany during World War I. He returned to Finland in 1918 and worked in the Karhula glass factory up to his death, ultimately as its technical director.

He performed an officer examination in 1928, becoming an engineer lieutenant. He also was a local chief of the Kymi White Guard.

He died of a cardiac arrest.

Sources

References 

Finnish male artistic gymnasts
Gymnasts at the 1908 Summer Olympics
Olympic gymnasts of Finland
Olympic bronze medalists for Finland
1888 births
1936 deaths
Olympic medalists in gymnastics
Medalists at the 1908 Summer Olympics
20th-century Finnish people